Parliamentary elections were held in Greece on 16 November 1952. They resulted in a victory for General Alexander Papagos and the party he had founded the previous year, the Greek Rally party. Papagos won by unifying most of the conservative forces under his leadership, and taking advantage of a weakened centre. The electorate of Konstantinos Tsaldaris' People's Party, the leading conservative party in the 1950 elections, shrank to only 1%.

Results

References

Parliamentary elections in Greece
Greece
Legislative election
1950s in Greek politics
Greece
Legl